Cairnsgarroch is a hill in the Rhinns of Kells, a sub-range of the Galloway Hills range, part of the Southern Uplands of Scotland. Really one of approximately six satellites of the main ridge, it is usually climbed as a detour. Ascents starting from Garryhorn or Forrest Estate near Carsphairn are the most common, often as part of a complete traverse of the ridge.

References

Mountains and hills of the Southern Uplands
Mountains and hills of Dumfries and Galloway
Donald mountains